Sea Gayle Music is an independent music publishing company based in Nashville, Tennessee in the United States.  It was formed in 1999 by songwriter Chris DuBois, songwriter/producer Frank Rogers, and songwriter/artist Brad Paisley.  In 2010 and 2011, Sea Gayle Music was named ASCAP Country Publisher of the Year.  This was the first time since 1982 that an independent music publishing company has won this award.The company is under the umbrella of Sea Gayle INC.

Current Writers
 Smith Ahnquist
 Brent Anderson
 Barrett Baber
 Chris DuBois
 Claire Ernst
 Jordan Fletcher
 Jeb Gipson
 Jordan Gray
 Leaving Austin
 Lynn Hutton
 Brad Paisley
 Jenna Paulette
 Bobby Pinson
 Maggie Rose
 Brent Rupard
 Brett Sheroky

Past Writers
 Ingrid Andress
 Wade Bowen
 Jim Brown
 Jordan Brooker
 Richie Brown
 Byron "Mr. Talkbox" Chambers
 Brandy Clark
 Larry Cordle
 Clint Daniels
 Radney Foster
 Liz Hengber
 Carolyn Dawn Johnson
 Jay Knowles
 Clint Lagerberg
 Jesse Lee
 Kelley Lovelace
 Tim Menzies
 Jaden Michaels
 Lee Thomas Miller
 Clay Mills
 Jake Mitchell
 Jerrod Niemann
 Tim Owens
 Frank Rogers
 Mike Ryan
 Don Sampson
 Don Schlitz
 Steve Schnur
 Jordyn Shellhart
 Bryan Simpson
 CJ Solar
 Chris Stapleton
 Dave Turnbull
 Trent Willmon
 Baylor Wilson

Charting Singles

Number One Songs

Other Hits

Awards
 2000 MusicRow Song of the Year – "He Didn’t Have To Be" by Brad Paisley
 2004 Grammy Award for Best Country Song – "It's Five O’Clock Somewhere" by Alan Jackson with Jimmy Buffett
 2004 ASCAP Country Song of the Year - "It's Five O'Clock Somewhere" by Alan Jackson with Jimmy Buffett
 2008 MusicRow Song of the Year – “Letter To Me” by Brad Paisley
 2008 Academy of Country Music Song of the Year – "In Color" by Jamey Johnson
 2009 Country Music Association Song of the Year – "In Color" by Jamey Johnson
 2009 MusicRow Song of the Year – "In Color" by Jamey Johnson
 2009 NSAI Country Song of the Year – "Waitin' On A Woman" by Brad Paisley
 2010 ASCAP Country Publisher of the Year
 2011 ASCAP Country Publisher of the Year

References

Music publishing companies of the United States
Companies based in Nashville, Tennessee
Publishing companies established in 1999
1999 establishments in Tennessee